James Chalmers (3 December 1877 – 12 July 1915) was a Scottish professional footballer who played in the Football League for Sunderland, Notts County and Preston North End as a forward. He also played in the Southern League for Swindon Town, Watford, Tottenham Hotspur and Norwich City.

Personal life 
Chalmers served as a private in the Royal Scots Fusiliers during the First World War and died of wounds suffered at Achi Baba Nullah, Gallipoli on 12 July 1915. He is commemorated on the Helles Memorial.

Career statistics

References

1877 births
Footballers from Dumfries and Galloway
Scottish footballers
Association football outside forwards
English Football League players
British Army personnel of World War I
1915 deaths
Royal Scots Fusiliers soldiers
Association football inside forwards
Beith F.C. players
Greenock Morton F.C. players
Sunderland A.F.C. players
Preston North End F.C. players
Notts County F.C. players
Partick Thistle F.C. players
Watford F.C. players
Tottenham Hotspur F.C. players
Swindon Town F.C. players
Norwich City F.C. players
Bristol Rovers F.C. players
Clyde F.C. players
Scottish Football League players
Southern Football League players
British military personnel killed in World War I